Twenty Chickens for a Saddle: The Story of an African Childhood is a 2008 memoir by British author Robyn Scott.

External links 
official book website

References

British autobiographies
2008 non-fiction books
Bloomsbury Publishing books
Works about Botswana